Armando Gonçalves Teixeira  (born 25 September 1976), known as Petit, is a Portuguese former professional footballer who played as a defensive midfielder. He is currently the manager of Boavista.

He received the moniker Petit because of his small frame, and also because he was born in France. He also became known as Pitbull by supporters because of his fierce approach, in addition to a powerful outside shot.

After helping Boavista win their first and only Primeira Liga championship, he went on to amass more than 200 official appearances for Benfica, winning another three major titles. He also spent several seasons in Germany with 1. FC Köln, but his later years were marred by injury problems.

A Portugal international during the 2000s, Petit represented the nation in two World Cups – finishing fourth in the 2006 edition – and as many European Championships. He started working as a manager in 2012, with Boavista, and led five other top-flight teams.

Club career

Early years and Boavista
Petit was born to Portuguese parents in Strasbourg, France, and moved to his parents' motherland at the age of two, settling in the Bom Pastor area of Paranhos in Porto. After four years with modest clubs, he first established himself at the Primeira Liga with Gil Vicente F.C. where he was a key player, helping the Barcelos team to their best ever first division finish (fifth, narrowly missing out on qualification to the UEFA Cup).

Petit left for Boavista F.C. after one season, being instrumental in the side's only league conquest and going on to have his first experience in the UEFA Champions League. He made his debut in the latter competition on 11 September 2001, playing the full 90 minutes in a 1–1 group stage away draw against Liverpool.

Benfica
In the summer of 2002, Petit moved to S.L. Benfica, being an instant first choice. In his third year, he scored twice in 29 games as the club ended an 11-year drought and won the national championship.

After impressive showings in the team's 2005–06 Champions League campaign, which ended at the hands of eventual champions FC Barcelona in the quarter-finals, Manchester United and Olympique Lyonnais were linked with Petit, whom eventually renewed his contract a further two years.

FC Köln
On 30 July 2008, Petit signed a two-year contract with newly-promoted 1. FC Köln from Germany. He netted his first goal with his new club on 7 August, against SV Niederauerbach in the first round of the domestic cup. On 1 November he scored his first in the Bundesliga, a 90th-minute effort against VfB Stuttgart in a 3–1 victory, ending his debut season with 31 matches out of 34 as the team easily retained their status.

The 35-year-old Petit missed the entire 2011–12 due to an anterior cruciate ligament injury, and Köln were also relegated. In August 2012 he returned to Boavista, with the club now in the third division.

International career
Petit made his debut for Portugal on 2 June 2001, in a 1–1 draw against Republic of Ireland in Dublin for the 2002 FIFA World Cup qualifiers. He played for the nation in the finals, and was also a member of the team that reached the final at UEFA Euro 2004, held on home soil.

Petit scored from two long free kicks in a 7–1 home drubbing of Russia in the 2006 World Cup qualifying campaign, going on to be selected for the final stages in Germany where he netted an own goal in the 61st minute of the third place playoff against the hosts, becoming the fourth player in the tournament to score in that fashion.

Prior to the start of Euro 2008, Petit announced that he would retire from international football at 31. In total, he won 57 caps and scored four goals.

Coaching career
In October 2012, Petit was appointed player-coach of Boavista, becoming the full-time manager in the following season. The club returned to the top flight for administrative reasons in 2014, and on his professional managerial debut he lost 1–0 at home to Benfica on 24 August.

On 9 December 2015, after leaving the hotseat at the Estádio do Bessa for personal motives, Petit was appointed at C.D. Tondela for their first top-division campaign. He was one of three coaches in charge, as the team avoided relegation in the last matchday.

Subsequently, Petit signed a new deal to last until 2018, but left on 8 January 2017 after a 1–2 home loss to F.C. Arouca. That March he was hired at Moreirense F.C. with the goal of keeping them in the main division, and left two months later by mutual consent when that was achieved.

On 23 October 2017, F.C. Paços de Ferreira hired Petit in an attempt to preserve their place in the top tier, and he left by his own accord the following January. He returned to Moreirense in February as their third manager of the season, and left again after keeping them up.

Petit was appointed manager of C.S. Marítimo on 27 November 2018, on a contract lasting until the end of the campaign. He left the Madeiran club at its conclusion, as it did not exercise the option of another year.

On 15 January 2020, Petit was hired by his sixth Portuguese top-division side, becoming the third coach of Belenenses SAD's campaign as they were one point above the relegation zone. He reached the quarter-finals of the Taça de Portugal in his one complete season, being eliminated 3–0 at Benfica. On 19 October 2021, having needed a goal in the last minute of extra time to defeat minnows Berço SC in the cup, he resigned with eight months of his contract remaining; the team had earned four points and no wins in the first eight games of the league campaign.

Petit returned to Boavista on 2 December 2021, on a deal until 2023. Two weeks later, he took the club to the Taça da Liga semi-finals for the first time following a 5–1 home rout of S.C. Braga.

Career statistics

Club
Sources:

International
Source:

International goals
	

|}

Managerial statistics

Honours

Club
Boavista
Primeira Liga: 2000–01

Benfica
Primeira Liga: 2004–05
Taça de Portugal: 2003–04
Supertaça Cândido de Oliveira: 2005

International
Portugal
UEFA European Championship runner-up: 2004

Individual
Portuguese Footballer of the Year: 2001
Portuguese Golden Ball: 2006

Orders
 Medal of Merit, Order of the Immaculate Conception of Vila Viçosa (House of Braganza)

References

External links

1976 births
Living people
French people of Portuguese descent
Citizens of Portugal through descent
Portuguese footballers
Footballers from Porto
Footballers from Strasbourg
Association football midfielders
Primeira Liga players
Liga Portugal 2 players
Segunda Divisão players
A.D. Esposende players
Gondomar S.C. players
C.F. União de Lamas players
Gil Vicente F.C. players
Boavista F.C. players
S.L. Benfica footballers
Bundesliga players
1. FC Köln players
Portugal international footballers
2002 FIFA World Cup players
UEFA Euro 2004 players
2006 FIFA World Cup players
UEFA Euro 2008 players
Portuguese expatriate footballers
Expatriate footballers in Germany
Portuguese expatriate sportspeople in Germany
Portuguese football managers
Primeira Liga managers
Boavista F.C. managers
C.D. Tondela managers
Moreirense F.C. managers
F.C. Paços de Ferreira managers
C.S. Marítimo managers
Belenenses SAD managers